The Table is a 1973 short film written by Adrian Lyne and Michael Hayes. It marks Lyne's debut as a director. It stars Derek O'Conor and Kate Williams. It was Lyne's first short film and was well received at the London Film Festival. The film also featured the director's son Louis Lyne as a small boy. The film was broadcast on British television in 1987.

Premise
A couple argue at the breakfast table, as seen from the table's point-of-view.

Cast
 Derek O'Conor
 Kate Williams
 Louis Lyne

References

External links

1973 films
1973 short films
British short films
Films about couples
Films directed by Adrian Lyne
1970s English-language films